1948–49 was the third season of the Western International Hockey League. 

The league champion Spokane Flyers went on to face the Windsor Spitfires in a best-of-seven series for the national amateur hockey title.

Standings
 Spokane Flyers	                                37-16-1	.694	261-198
 Kimberley Dynamiters	18-23-1	.440	187-194
 Nelson Maple Leafs	                                18-24-0	.429	162-184
 Trail Smoke Eaters	15-25-2	.372	187-221

League Championship final
Best of 5

    * Kimberley 4 Spokane 1
    * Spokane 4 Kimberley 1
    * Spokane 10 Kimberley 1
    * Spokane 2 Kimberley 0

Spokane Flyers beat Kimberley Dynamiters 3 wins to 1.

Note: Spokane Flyers were not eligible for the Allan Cup so the Kimberley Dynamiters advanced to the final. The Spokane Flyers did advance to the 1948-49 United States National Senior Championship.

Semi final
Best of 5

    * Nelson 9 Trail 3
    * Nelson 3 Trail 1
    * Trail 5 Nelson 0
    * Trail 5 Nelson 3
    * Trail 5 Nelson 3

Trail Smoke Eaters beat Nelson Maple Leafs 3 wins to 2.

Final
Best of 5

    * Trail 3 Kimberley 3
    * Trail 5 Kimberley 2
    * Trail 6 Kimberley 2
    * Kimberley 3 Trail 2
    * Trail 3 Kimberley 2

Trail Smoke Eaters beat Kimberley Dynamiters 3 wins to none, 1 tie.

This was the only senior league in the province so the Trail Smoke Eaters advanced to the 1948-49 Western Canada Allan Cup Playoffs.

All-Star teams

Source:

References 

The Spokesman-Review - Oct 16, 1948

Western International Hockey League seasons
Wihl
Wihl